Purgitsville is an unincorporated community in Hampshire County in the U.S. state of West Virginia. According to the 2000 census, the ZCTA for Purgitsville had a population of 813. Purgitsville is located on U.S. Highway 220/West Virginia Route 28 at its intersection with Huffman Road (West Virginia Secondary Route 220/3) south of Junction. An elementary school, Mill Creek Elementary, was open here until 1993 when it was consolidated with Romney Elementary.

The community was named after William Purgit, an early settler. In 1863, McNeill's Rangers were ambushed near the village by the Ringgold Cavalry, a Union force, but escaped with no fatalities.

Historic sites 
 Marvin Chapel
 Old Pine Church (1838)

Gallery

References

External links
 Old Pine Church website
 Robert F. Pliska & Company Winery
 The Vineyard Home

Unincorporated communities in Hampshire County, West Virginia
Unincorporated communities in West Virginia